The Case of Gabriel Perry is a 1935 British crime film directed by Albert de Courville and starring Henry Oscar, Olga Lindo and Margaret Lockwood.

Plot
An unstable Victorian doctor murders a woman.

Cast
 Henry Oscar as Gabriel Perry
 Olga Lindo as Mrs Perry
 Margaret Lockwood as Mildred Perry
 Franklin Dyall as Prosecution
 Raymond Lovell as Defence
 John Wood as Godfrey Perry
 Martita Hunt as Mrs Read
 Rodney Ackland as Tommy Read
 Percy Walsh as William Read
 Ralph Truman as Inspector White
 Alastair Sim as Minor role

Critical reception
Allmovie described it as a "rusty-dusty British courtroom drama."

References

External links

The Case of Gabriel Perry at TCMDB

Films directed by Albert de Courville
1935 crime films
1935 films
British crime films
British black-and-white films
1930s English-language films
1930s British films